Awad Al-Nashri (born 15 March 2002), is a Saudi Arabian professional footballer who plays as a midfielder for Saudi Professional League side Al-Ittihad.

Career statistics

Club

Notes

Honours

Al-Ittihad
Saudi Super Cup: 2022

Saudi Arabia U23
AFC U-23 Asian Cup: 2022
WAFF U-23 Championship: 2022

References

External links
 

2002 births
Living people
Saudi Arabian footballers
Saudi Arabia youth international footballers
Saudi Arabia international footballers
Association football midfielders
Saudi Professional League players
Ittihad FC players